In number theory, friendly numbers are two or more natural numbers with a common abundancy index, the ratio between the sum of divisors of a number and the number itself. Two numbers with the same "abundancy" form a friendly pair; n numbers with the same "abundancy" form a friendly n-tuple.

Being mutually friendly is an equivalence relation, and thus induces a partition of the positive naturals into clubs (equivalence classes) of mutually "friendly numbers".

A number that is not part of any friendly pair is called solitary.

The "abundancy" index of n is the rational number σ(n) / n, in which σ denotes the sum of divisors function. A number n is a "friendly number" if there exists m ≠ n such that σ(m) / m = σ(n) / n. "Abundancy" is not the same as abundance, which is defined as σ(n) − 2n.

"Abundancy" may also be expressed as  where  denotes a divisor function with  equal to the sum of the k-th powers of the divisors of n.

The numbers 1 through 5 are all solitary. The smallest "friendly number" is 6, forming for example, the "friendly" pair 6 and 28 with "abundancy" σ(6) / 6 = (1+2+3+6) / 6 = 2, the same as σ(28) / 28 = (1+2+4+7+14+28) / 28 = 2. The shared value 2 is an integer in this case but not in many other cases. Numbers with "abundancy" 2 are also known as perfect numbers. There are several unsolved problems related to the "friendly numbers".

In spite of the similarity in name, there is no specific relationship between the friendly numbers and the amicable numbers or the sociable numbers, although the definitions of the latter two also involve the divisor function.

Examples 
As another example, 30 and 140 form a friendly pair, because 30 and 140 have the same "abundancy":

The numbers 2480, 6200 and 40640 are also members of this club, as they each have an "abundancy" equal to 12/5.

For an example of odd numbers being friendly, consider 135 and 819 ("abundancy" 16/9 (deficient)). There are also cases of even being "friendly" to odd, such as 42 and 544635 ("abundancy" 16/7). The odd "friend" may be less than the even one, as in 84729645 and 155315394 ("abundancy" 896/351).

A square number can be friendly, for instance both 693479556 (the square of 26334) and 8640 have "abundancy" 127/36 (this example is accredited to Dean Hickerson).

Status for small n 
Other numbers have unknown status and are yellow.

Solitary numbers 

A number that belongs to a singleton club, because no other number is "friendly" with it, is a solitary number. All prime numbers are known to be solitary, as are powers of prime numbers. More generally, if the numbers n and σ(n) are coprime – meaning that the greatest common divisor of these numbers is 1, so that σ(n)/n is an irreducible fraction – then the number n is solitary . For a prime number p we have σ(p) = p + 1, which is co-prime with p.

No general method is known for determining whether a number is "friendly" or solitary. The smallest number whose classification is unknown is 10; it is conjectured to be solitary. If it is not, its smallest friend is at least . Small numbers with a relatively large smallest friend do exist: for instance, 24 is "friendly", with its smallest friend 91,963,648.

Large clubs
It is an open problem whether there are infinitely large clubs of mutually "friendly" numbers. The perfect numbers form a club, and it is conjectured that there are infinitely many perfect numbers (at least as many as there are Mersenne primes), but no proof is known. , 51 perfect numbers are known, the largest of which has more than 49 million digits in decimal notation.  There are clubs with more known members: in particular, those formed by multiply perfect numbers, which are numbers whose "abundancy" is an integer.  , the club of "friendly" numbers with "abundancy" equal to 9 has 2130 known members.  Although some are known to be quite large, clubs of multiply perfect numbers (excluding the perfect numbers themselves) are conjectured to be finite.

Asymptotic density
Every pair a, b of friendly numbers gives rise to a positive proportion of all natural numbers being friendly (but in different clubs), by considering pairs na, nb for multipliers n with gcd(n, ab) = 1. For example, the "primitive" friendly pair 6 and 28 gives rise to friendly pairs 6n and 28n for all n that are congruent to 1, 5, 11, 13, 17, 19, 23, 25, 29, 31, 37, or 41 modulo 42.

This shows that the natural density of the friendly numbers (if it exists) is positive.

Anderson and Hickerson proposed that the density should in fact be 1 (or equivalently that the density of the solitary numbers should be 0). According to the MathWorld article on Solitary Number (see References section below), this conjecture has not been resolved, although Pomerance thought at one point he had disproved it.

Notes

References 
Grime, James. A video about the number 10. Numberphile.

Divisor function
Integer sequences
Unsolved problems in number theory